The year 1911 in film involved some significant events.



Events
February: The Motion Picture Story Magazine, the first American film fan magazine, is published. It is followed later in the year by Photoplay.
April 8: Winsor McCay releases his first film Little Nemo, one of the earliest animated films.
October 23 (October 10 OS): Svetozar Botorić's The Life and Deeds of the Immortal Leader Karađorđe (Život i dela besmrtnog vožda Karađorđa, Живот и дела бесмртног вожда Карађорђа) premieres in Belgrade and becomes the first feature film made in Serbia and the Balkans. 
October 26: Defence of Sevastopol («Оборона Севастополя») premieres at the Crimean palace of Tsar Nicholas II and becomes the first feature-length film made in the Russian Empire and one of the first in the world.
October 27: David Horsley's Nestor Motion Picture Company opens the first motion picture studio in Hollywood.
November: The Kalem Company of New York pays the estate of author Lew Wallace $25,000 in legal settlement for having adapted Ben Hur (1907 film) from his novel without securing prior rights.

Films released in 1911

 Aerial Anarchists
 Alkali Ike's Auto, starring Bronco Billy Anderson
 Les Aventures de Baron de Munchhausen (aka Baron Munchausen), directed by Georges Melies
 The Baby's Ghost (French/ Lux Film)
 Baseball and Bloomers
 The Battle, directed by D. W. Griffith
 Beneath the Tower Ruins (British-French co-production produced by Charles Urban)
 The Bells, Australian film in 1911 written and directed by W. J. Lincoln, based on the 1871 play by Leopold Lewis
 The Bewitched Window (French/ Pathe)
 Bill Bumper's Bargain, starring Francis X. Bushman as Mephistopheles 
 Bill Taken for a Ghost (French/ Lux Film) aka Patouillard Fantome, directed by Romeo Bosetti; one of a series of 60 silent films made in France all featuring the comic character Patouillard (the character's name was changed to "Bill" in the US)
 The Black Arrow, based on the Robert Louis Stevenson novel The Black Arrow
 Blood Vengeance, Italian film directed by Luigi Maggi, starring Antonietta Calderari, based on a story by Gabriele (Cabiria) D'Anunzio
 Brown of Harvard
 The Buddhist Priestess
 By the House That Jack Built (Imp/ Universal) directed by Thomas H. Ince, starring Mary Pickford
 Cally's Comet
 The Coffin Ship
 The Colonel and the King
 Courting Across the Court
 The Cowboy and the Lady
 Curse of the Wandering Minstrel (Walturdaw Films)
 Dandy Dick of Bishopgate, British film directed by Theo Frenkel, shot in the two-color Kinemacolor process
 David Copperfield (Thanhouser) directed by George O. Nichols
 Defence of Sevastopol, Russian film directed by Vasili Goncharov
 The Demon (an Italian/Russian co-production) directed by Giovanni Vitrotti, starring Madame Cemesnova and Mikhail Tamarov, based on a poem by Mikhail Lermonto
 The Devil as a Lawyer (German/ Messter Films, UFA) 
 The Devil's Sonata, Danish film based on a musical work by the 18th-century Italian composer Giuseppe Tarantini, plot is similar to the 1894 George du Maurier novel Trilby.
 The Diabolical Church Window, directed by Georges Melies
 Dr. Charlie is a Great Surgeon (Eclair Prods.)
 The Dream, directed by Thomas H. Ince, starring Mary Pickford
 Enoch Arden, directed by D. W. Griffith
 An Evil Power (Selig-Polyscope) written and directed by Francis Boggs, starring Sydney Ayres and Frank Clark
 The Fairy Jewel (Italian film directed by Giuseppe de Liguoro)
 The Fall Of Troy, directed by Giovanni Pastrone
 Faust (British/ Hepworth) directed by Cecil M. Hepworth, starring Hay Plumb and Jack Hulcup (as Mephistopheles). 
 Faust and Marguerite (French/ Gaumont) directed by Jean Durand, starring Gaston Modot 
 First Indy 500 (First year footage from the auto race.  Filmed on May 30, 1911.)
 The Fisherman's Nightmare (French/ Pathe)
 Flames and Fortune
 For Her Sake
 From Death to Life (Rex Films/ Universal) featured a mad scientist
 The Ghost's Warning (Edison Prods.) directed by Ashley Miller, starring Mary Fuller, Darwin Karr and Marc McDermott
 The Golden Beetle (Italian/ Cines-Kleine) ran 60 minutes
 The Haunted Cafe (German film/ Messter) aka The Bewitched Restaurant, produced by Oskar Messter, starring Henny Porten, featured trick photography effects a la Melies
 The Haunted House (French/ Gaumont)
 The Haunted House (Universal/ Imp) directed by William F. Haddock, starring King Baggot
 His Trust, directed by D. W. Griffith
 His Trust Fulfilled, directed by D. W. Griffith.  The sequel to Griffith's earlier 1911 short film "His Trust"
 Her Crowning Glory
 The Higher Law
 The Hunchback (British) directed by A. E. Coleby, starring Edwin J. Collins as the hunchback
 Hypnotism (French/ Lux) starring James Mapelli, based on the 1894 George du Maurier novel Trilby
 The Inferno (L'Inferno) (Italian) aka Dante's Inferno, a big budget spectacular adapted from Dante Alighieri's Divine Comedy;  directed by Francesco Bertolini and Giuseppe De Liguoro, starring Salvatore Anzelmo Papa and Arturo Pirovano
 The Inner Mind (Selig-Polyscope Co.)
 It Is Never Too Late to Mend (Australian film) written and directed by W. J. Lincoln, based on the 1856 Charles Reade novel, later remade in 1937 starring Tod Slaughter
 Jones' Nightmare; or, The Lobster Still Pursued Him (British/ Acme Films) directed by Fred Rains (Claude Rains' father) who also starred.
 Kitty in Dreamland (British/ Klein-Urban)
 The Legend of the Lake (Italian/ Cines Films) based on the Legend of the Undines
 The Life of a Nun (Danish/ Nordisk) starring Edith Buemann Psilander, possibly the first ever "nunsploitation" film, said to have inspired comic book artist Bob Kane to create a 1940s "Batman" comic book villain called The Monk
 Little Nemo, silent animated short film by American cartoonist Winsor McCay
 Little Red Riding Hood (British/ C&M Prods.)
 Little Red Riding Hood (Essanay Films) starring Eva Prout 
 Little Red Riding Hood (Majestic) starring Mary Pickford
 The Lobster Nightmare (British/ Walturdaw Films) not to be confused with Jones' Nightmare above.
 The Lonedale Operator, directed by D. W. Griffith, starring Blanche Sweet
 The Love of a Siren, aka Amore di sirena (Italian/ Cines)
 The Man-Monkey (British/ C&M)
 The Masque of the Red Death (Italian/ Ambrosio) based on the famous 1842 story by Edgar Allan Poe; said to have influenced Charles Beaumont when he wrote the screenplay for the 1964 Roger Corman-produced remake.
 The Miser's Heart, directed by D. W. Griffith
 A Modern Yarn (French/ Pathe)
 The Moonstone (British) produced by Charles Urban, based on the 1868 novel by Wilkie Collins
 Der Müller und sein Kind (translation from Austrian: The Miller and His Child)
 The Mummy (French/ Pathe)
 The Mummy (Thanhouser)
 The Mummy (British/ Charles Urban Films)
 The Mysterious Stranger (French/ Eclipse)
 Notre Dame de Paris (French/ Pathe) aka The Hunchback of Notre Dame, directed by Albert Capellani, starring Henri Krauss as Quasimodo and Stacia Mapierkowska as Esmeralda, based on the Victor Hugo novel 
 The Odyssey (L'Odissea)
 An Old Time Nightmare (Powers Films) features giant birds
 The Pasha's Daughter
 The Pied Piper of Hamlin (French/ Pathe)
 The Pied Piper of Hamlin (Thanhouser Prods.)
 Princess Clementina
 Purgatory (Italian/ Helios Films) directed by Giuseppe Berardi (who also stars) and Arturo Busnego; a sequel to Helios' Inferno (1910).
 Queen of Spades (Italian/ Cines) based on the 1834 story Pikovaya dama by Russian writer Alexander Pushkin; a lost film.
 The Railroad Builder
 Rosalie and Spiritisme (French/ Pathe-Lux)
 Satan Defeated, aka Satan Vaincu (French/ Pathe); a lost film.
 Satan on Mischief Bent (British) produced by Charles Urban
 The Saving of Faust (French/ Pathe) 
 The Scarlet Letter
 She (Thanhouser) written by Theodore Marston, directed by George Nichols, starring Marguerite Snow, James Cruze; based on the 1886 H. Rider Haggard novel
 The Smuggler
 A Spiritualistic Seance (French/ Pathe)
 Sweet Memories
 Swords and Hearts, directed by D. W. Griffith
 A Tale of Two Cities
 That's Happiness
 Trilby and Svengali (British/ Kinematograph) produced by Charles Urban, directed by Theo Frankel (who also starred in it); filmed in color; based on the 1894 George du Maurier novel Trilby
 What Shall We Do with Our Old?
 Willy the Ghost (French/ Eclair Films) aka Willy Fantome, directed by Joseph Faivre, starring Willy Saunders (who starred in around 70 films all featuring the character "Willy".
 Winsor McCay And His Animated Pictures
 The Witch of Abruzzi (Belgian/ Le Lion Films) this Belgium film was partially shot in France.
 The Witch of Seville (Italian/ Itala Films) aka La Strega de Siviglia
 Won by Wireless

Births
January 5 – Jean-Pierre Aumont, actor (died 2001)
January 7 – Butterfly McQueen, actress (died 1995)
January 22 – Mary Hayley Bell, actress, writer and dramatist, wife of Sir John Mills (d 2005)
January 30 – Hugh Marlowe, actor (died 1982)
January 31 – Eddie Byrne, actor (died 1981)
February 6 – Ronald Reagan, actor, United States President (died 2004)
February 9 – Gypsy Rose Lee, actress and burlesque dancer (died 1970)
February 14 – Florence Rice, actress (died 1974)
February 19 – Merle Oberon, actress (died 1979)
February 20 – Margot Grahame, actress (died 1982)
March 3 – Jean Harlow, actress (died 1937)
March 10 – Edward Norris, actor, (died 2002)
March 18 – Smiley Burnette, actor, musician (died 1967)
April 23 – Ronald Neame, cinematographer, producer and director (died 2010)
May 7  – Ishirō Honda, director (died 1993)
May 11 
Louise Campbell, actress (died 1997)
Phil Silvers, actor (died 1985)
May 17 – Maureen O'Sullivan, actress (died 1998)
May 18 – Sigrid Gurie, actress (died 1969)
May 27 – Vincent Price, actor (died 1993)
May 30 – Douglas Fowley, actor (died 1998)
June 1 – Gertrude Michael, actress (died 1964)
June 3 – Ellen Corby, actress (died 1999)
June 20 – Gail Patrick  (died 1980)
June 29 – Bernard Hermann, composer (died 1975)
July 6 – Laverne Andrews, singer, actress, member of Andrews Sisters (died 1967)
July 14 – Terry-Thomas, actor (died 1990)
July 16 – Ginger Rogers, actress, dancer (died 1995)
July 18 – Hume Cronyn, actor (died 2003)
July 28 – Ann Doran, actress (died 2000)
August 2 – Ann Dvorak, American actress (died 1979)
August 3 – Alex McCrindle, British actor (died 1990)
August 5 – Robert Taylor, actor (died 1969)
August 6 – Lucille Ball, actress (died 1989)
August 7 – Nicholas Ray, director (died 1979)
August 12 – Cantinflas, actor (died 1993)
August 19 – Constance Worth, actress (died 1963)
September 2 – Erwin Hillier, cinematographer (died 2005)
September 10 – Renée Simonot, actress and voice artist (died 2021)
October 13 – Ashok Kumar, actor, India (died 2001)
October 20 – Will Rogers, Jr., actor (died 1993)
October 27 – Leif Erickson, actor (died 1986)
October 30 – Ruth Hussey, actress (died 2005)
October 31 – Sheila Bromley, actress, (died 2003)
November 5 
Roy Rogers, singer, actor (died 1998)
Baby Marie Osborne, child actress (died 2010)
November 10 – Harry Andrews, actor (died 1989)
December 8 – Lee J. Cobb, actor (died 1976)
December 9 – Broderick Crawford, actor (died 1986)
December 23 – James Gregory, actor (died 2002)
December 29 – Claire Dodd, actress (died 1973)
December 30 – Jeanette Nolan, actress (died 1998)

Deaths

 January 18 – Arthur Marvin, cinematographer, (born 1859)
 May 29 – W. S. Gilbert, producer of musicals, half of the team of Gilbert and Sullivan, (born 1836)
 July 18 – Genevieve Lantelme, actress, (born 1883)
 August 11 – Verner Clarges, actor, (born 1846)
 October 27 – Francis Boggs, director, (born 1870)
 November 2 – Kyrle Bellew, actor, (born 1855)
 December 22 – Wright Lorimer, stage actor, screenwriter, (born 1874)
 Unknown – Woodville Latham, producer and exhibitor whose desire to shoot an entire boxing match on a single reel of film led to the invention of the Latham loop (born 1837)

Debuts

 Lionel Barrymore – The Battle
 Francis X. Bushman – His Friend's Wife (short)
 Paul Kelly – Jimmie's Job (short)
 Edgar Kennedy – Brown of Harvard
 Ann Little – The Indian Maiden's Lesson (short)
 Harold Lockwood – The White Red Man (short)
 Anna Q. Nilsson – Molly Pitcher (short)
 Anita Stewart – A Tale of Two Cities as Anna Stewart
 Lenore Ulric – The First Man (1911 short)
 Lois Weber – director, actress, A Heroine of '76 (short); writer, On the Brink (short)

References

 
Film by year